Kabri Dar Airport is an airport in Kebri Dahar, Ethiopia .

Airlines and destinations

Accidents and incidents
On 12 June 1977, Douglas C-47A ET-AAP of Ethiopian Airlines was reported to have been damaged beyond economic repair in a landing accident when the port undercarriage collapsed.

References

External links 

Airports in Ethiopia
Somali Region